The Macfarlan Ministry was the 52nd ministry of the Government of Victoria. It was led by the Premier of Victoria, Ian Macfarlan and consisted of members of the Liberal Party, the Country Party and two Independents. The ministry was known as the "stop gap ministry", and was formed when a crisis developed over loss of supply to Albert Dunstan's government. The ministry was sworn in on 2 October 1945, and met in parliament once on 3 October for the sole purpose of passing the supply bill for the next two months. Once the supply bill was passed, the Governor of Victoria, Sir Winston Dugan, dissolved the parliament and issued writs for an election. Despite the short-lived parliament, Macfarlan's ministers retained their commissions until John Cain's ministry was sworn in on 21 November following Labor's election victory.

Portfolios

References

External links
Victoria Government Gazette No. 130, Government of Victoria, 2 October 1945

Victoria (Australia) ministries
Liberal Party of Australia ministries in Victoria (Australia)
Ministries of George VI
Cabinets established in 1945
Cabinets disestablished in 1945
1945 establishments in Australia
1945 disestablishments in Australia